This is a list of mayors of the City of Lévis in the Province of Quebec, Canada.

 1861 - 1870: Louis Carrier, first mayor
 1870 - 1871: Georges Couture
 1871 - 1874: Jacques Jobin
 1874 - 1874: Prudent Grégoire Roy
 1874 - 1884: Georges Couture
 1884 - 1885: Pierre Lefrançois
 1886 - 1890: Thimolaüs Beaulieu
 1891 - 1896: Isidore-Noël Belleau
 1896 - 1900: Joseph-Edmond Roy
 1900 - 1902: H.-Edmond Dupré
 1902 - 1905: Napoléon Lamontagne
 1905 - 1906: Eusèbe Belleau
 1906 - 1907: S.-Cléophas Auger
 1907 - 1917: Alphonse Bernier 
 1917 - 1920: Noël Belleau
 1920 - 1921: Joseph-K. Laflamme
 1921 - 1927: Émile Demers
 1927 - 1929: J.-Cléophas Blouin
 1929 - 1933: Joseph Leblond
 1933 - 1943: Sylvio Durand
 1943 - 1957: Adélard Bégin
 1957 - 1966: Clément-M. Thivierge
 1966 - 1990: Vincent F. Chagnon
 1990 - 1994: Robert Guay, former Lauzon mayor
 1994 - 1998: Denis Guay
 1998 - 2005: Jean Garon
 2005 - 2013: Danielle Roy Marinelli
 2013 - present: Gilles Lehouillier

See also 
Lévis, Quebec

Levis